Zyxin is a protein that in humans is encoded by the ZYX gene.

Function 

Focal adhesions are actin-rich structures that enable cells to adhere to the extracellular matrix and at which protein complexes involved in signal transduction assemble. Zyxin is a zinc-binding phosphoprotein that concentrates at focal adhesions and along the actin cytoskeleton. Zyxin has an N-terminal proline-rich domain and three LIM domains in its C-terminal half. The proline-rich domain may interact with SH3 domains of proteins involved in signal transduction pathways while the LIM domains are likely involved in protein-protein binding. Zyxin may function as a messenger in the signal transduction pathway that mediates adhesion-stimulated changes in gene expression and may modulate the cytoskeletal organization of actin bundles. Alternative splicing results in multiple transcript variants that encode the same isoform.

Interactions 

Zyxin has been shown to interact with:
 Actinin, alpha 1 
 ENAH, 
 LASP1, 
 LATS1,  and
 Vasodilator-stimulated phosphoprotein.

References

Further reading

External links 
 Zyxin Info with links in the Cell Migration Gateway 

Cytoskeleton